Allt Lwyd is a top of Waun Rydd in the Brecon Beacons National Park, in southern Powys, Wales.

The summit is heathery and marked by a small pile of stones. It is found at the end of Waun Rydd's south-east ridge. It overlooks Talybont Reservoir, and has the Talybont Forest on its steep flanks.

References

External links
 www.geograph.co.uk : photos of Waun Rydd and surrounding area

Nuttalls
Brecon Beacons
Mountains and hills of Powys